Coelospermum is a genus of flowering plants in the family Rubiaceae. The genus is found from southern China to Indo-China and the western Pacific.

Species

 Coelospermum balansanum Baill.
 Coelospermum crassifolium J.T.Johanss.
 Coelospermum dasylobum Halford & A.J.Ford
 Coelospermum decipiens Baill.
 Coelospermum fragrans (Montrouz.) Baill. ex Guillaumin
 Coelospermum paniculatum F.Muell.
 Coelospermum purpureum Halford & A.J.Ford
 Coelospermum reticulatum (F.Muell.) Benth.
 Coelospermum salomoniense (Engl.) J.T.Johanss.
 Coelospermum truncatum (Wall.) Baill. ex K.Schum.
 Coelospermum volubile (Merr.) J.T.Johanss.

References

External links
Coelospermum in the World Checklist of Rubiaceae

Rubiaceae genera
Morindeae